Galene (minor planet designation: 427 Galene) is a typical main belt asteroid. It was discovered by the French astronomer Auguste Charlois on 27 August 1897 from Nice, and was named after Galene, one of the Nereids of Greek Mythology (Hesiod, Theogony, 240). A computer search suggests it is the most likely parent body of the impactor that generated the temporary cometary activity of 7968 Elst–Pizarro in 1996.

References

External links
 
 

Background asteroids
Galene
18970827
Galene